Qualification for men's artistic gymnastic competitions at the 2016 Summer Olympics was held at the HSBC Arena on 6 August 2016. The results of the qualification determined the qualifiers to the finals: 8 teams in the team final, 24 gymnasts in the all-around final, and 8 gymnasts in each of six apparatus finals. The competition was divided to 3 subdivisions.

Subdivisions
Gymnasts from nations taking part in the team all-around event are grouped together while the other gymnasts are grouped into one of six mixed groups. The groups were divided into the three subdivisions after a draw held by the Fédération Internationale de Gymnastique. The groups rotate through each of the four apparatuses together.

Subdivision 1

Mixed Group 3

Mixed Group 6

Subdivision 2

Mixed Group 4

Mixed Group 5

Subdivision 3

Mixed Group 1

Mixed Group 2

Qualification results

Individual all-around
The gymnasts who ranked top twenty four will qualify for final round. In case of there are more than two gymnasts in same NOC, the last ranked among them will not qualify to final round. The next best ranked gymnast will qualify instead.

Floor
The gymnasts who ranked top eight will qualify for final round. In case of there are more than two gymnasts in same NOC, the last ranked among them will not qualify to final round. The next best ranked gymnast will qualify instead.

Pommel horse
The gymnasts who ranked top eight will qualify for final round. In case of there are more than two gymnasts in same NOC, the last ranked among them will not qualify to final round. The next best ranked gymnast will qualify instead.

Rings
The gymnasts who ranked in the top eight qualify for the final, but if there are more than two gymnasts from the same NOC, the lower ranked are ineligible to qualify for the final; the next best ranked gymnasts will qualify instead.

Vault
The gymnasts who ranked top eight will qualify for final round. In case of there are more than two gymnasts in same NOC, the last ranked among them will not qualify to final round. The next best ranked gymnast will qualify instead.

Parallel bars
The gymnasts who ranked top eight will qualify for final round. In case of there are more than two gymnasts in same NOC, the last ranked among them will not qualify to final round. The next best ranked gymnast will qualify instead.

Horizontal bar
The gymnasts who ranked top eight will qualify for final round. In case of there are more than two gymnasts in same NOC, the last ranked among them will not qualify to final round. The next best ranked gymnast will qualify instead.

References

Men's artistic qualification
2016
Men's events at the 2016 Summer Olympics